The 2000 Adidas Open de Toulouse was a men's tennis tournament played on Indoor Hard in Toulouse, France that was part of the International Series 2 of the 2000 ATP Tour. It was the twentieth and final edition of the tournament and was held from 16 October – 22 October.

Seeds
Champion seeds are indicated in bold text while text in italics indicates the round in which those seeds were eliminated.

Draw

Finals

Top half

Bottom half

References

Singles
Grand Prix de Tennis de Toulouse